Miss Universe Kenya is a national pageant in Kenya that was first held in 2002 and an  annual national contest to choose ambassador for the Miss Universe pageant. Miss Universe Kenya is not related to the previous Miss World Kenya or Miss Kenya contests.

History
Miss Universe Kenya was held for first time in 2002. Between 1987 and 1995 the Miss Kenya winners represented Kenya at the Miss Universe. From 2002 to 2005 Miss Universe Kenya Organization made separation pageant in under Miss Universe Kenya Management in Nairobi. In 2006, Miss Universe Kenya went bankrupt and could no longer compete at Miss Universe. Began in 2014, Maria Sarungi Tsehai, national director for Miss Universe Tanzania, secured the rights to the Miss Universe Kenya franchise. The competition is back under a new director and owner.

In 2016 Miss Universe Kenya concept was sponsored by Hennessy drink company.

In 2018, Miss Universe Kenya made a come back with a one of a kind event. The pageant had over 250 girls applying, 100 made it to the first auditions that were held in the country's premiere futuristic mall Two Rivers Mall. Subsequent challenge boot-camps saw the girls narrowed down to final 15 who went on to battle for the title at a glamorous coronation evening held at Sankara Nairobi Hotel. The coronation night came to an end when Wabaiya Kariuki took the title.

Titleholders

Miss Universe Kenya
 
Miss Universe Kenya has started to send a Winner to Miss Universe from 2002. On occasion, when the winner does not qualify (due to age) for either contest, a runner-up is sent.

Miss Kenya 1987-1995

Wins by county

See also
 Miss Kenya
 Miss World Kenya

References

External links
missuniverse.co.ke

Beauty pageants in Kenya
Kenya
Recurring events established in 2004
Kenyan awards